Grace Episcopal Church is a historic church at 401 N. Esplanade in Cuero, Texas.

It was built in 1889 and added to the National Register of Historic Places in 1988.

See also

National Register of Historic Places listings in DeWitt County, Texas
Recorded Texas Historic Landmarks in DeWitt County

References

Episcopal churches in Texas
Churches on the National Register of Historic Places in Texas
Gothic Revival church buildings in Texas
Churches completed in 1889
19th-century Episcopal church buildings
Churches in DeWitt County, Texas
National Register of Historic Places in DeWitt County, Texas
Recorded Texas Historic Landmarks